is a Japanese voice actress and singer from Osaka Prefecture, Japan. In December 2017, she put her singing career on hold to focus on her voice acting career. 

She announced her marriage on September 26, 2019. On July 17, 2020, she announced that she had given birth to a baby boy.

Filmography

Anime
2011
Infinite Stratos, Kagura Shijūin
The Idolmaster, Takane Shijō
Sket Dance, Sawa Yamauchi
2012
Dusk Maiden of Amnesia, Yūko Kanoe
Ginga e Kickoff!!, Mrs. Mochizuki
Lagrange: The Flower of Rin-ne, Inaho Yukawa
2013
Log Horizon, Marielle
Ro-Kyu-Bu! SS, Aya Miyakōji
2014
Trinity Seven, Lilith Asami
Log Horizon 2, Marielle
2015
Overlord, Albedo
Mysterious Joker, Ai
Shomin Sample, Eri Hanae, Marika (Ep. 5), Fortuneteller Moon (Ep. 8)
Utawarerumono: Itsuwari no Kamen, Atui
2016
Anne Happy, Kodaira
Ange Vierge, Almaria
Brave Witches, Aleksandra I. "Sasha" Pokryshkin
Hitori no Shita: The Outcast, Fuusaen
The Ancient Magus' Bride: Those Awaiting a Star, Niikura, Mayumi + Maho
2017
Chaos;Child, Yui Tachibana
Ren'ai Bōkun, Shikimi Shiramine
Tales of Zestiria the X, Muse
2018
A Certain Magical Index III, Oyafune Suama
Ms. Koizumi Loves Ramen Noodles, Jun Takahashi
Overlord (Season 2 and 3), Albedo
Magical Girl Site, Kosame Amagai
How Not to Summon a Demon Lord, Alicia Cristela
2019
Isekai Quartet, Albedo
Val × Love, Futaba Saotome
2020
Isekai Quartet 2, Albedo
Kakushigoto, Kumi Jouro
2021
Log Horizon: Destruction of the Round Table, Marielle
Heaven's Design Team, Ueda
How Not to Summon a Demon Lord Ω, Alicia Cristela
Scarlet Nexus, Kyoka Eden
2022
Life with an Ordinary Guy Who Reincarnated into a Total Fantasy Knockout (Episode 8), Priestess
Overlord (Season 4), Albedo
Utawarerumono: Mask of Truth, Atui

Original video animation (OVA)
Senran Kagura: Estival Versus – Festival Eve Full of Swimsuits (2015), Yumi
Strike Witches: Operation Victory Arrow (2015), Aleksandra I. "Sasha" Pokryshkin
Bikini Warriors (2016), Kunoichi
Girls und Panzer: Das Finale (2017), Marie

Theatrical animation
Strike Witches: The Movie (2012), Aleksandra I. "Sasha" Pokryshkin
The Idolmaster Movie: Beyond the Brilliant Future! (2013), Takane Shijō
Accel World: Infinite Burst (2016), Utai Shinomiya/Ardor Maiden
New Initial D the Movie Legend 3: Dream (2016), Mako Sato
Trinity Seven the Movie: The Eternal Library and the Alchemist Girl (2017), Lilith Asami
Trinity Seven: Heavens Library & Crimson Lord (2019), Lilith Asami

Original net animation (ONA)
Puchimas! Petit Idolmaster (2014), Takane Shijō; Takanya

Video games
 Criminal Girls (2010), Tomoe Harukawa
Senran Kagura Shinovi Versus (2013), Yumi
Akiba's Trip (2013), Sara
 Criminal Girls: Invitation (2013), Tomoe Harukawa
Omega Quintet (2014), Shiori
Atelier Shallie: Alchemists of the Dusk Sea (2014), Rosemia
Granblue Fantasy (2014), Zalhamelina 
Mobius Final Fantasy (2015), Sarah
Senran Kagura Estival Versus (2015), Yumi
Tales of Zestiria (2015), Muse
Tekken 7 (2015), Kazumi Mishima
Utawarerumono: Itsuwari no Kamen (2015), Atui
Utawarerumono: Futari no Hakuoro (2016), Atui
Drive Girls (2017), Regalith
Senran Kagura: Peach Beach Splash (2017), Yumi
Fate/Grand Order (2018), Anastasia Nikolaevna Romanova
Brown Dust (2018), Celia
BlazBlue: Cross Tag Battle (2019), Yumi (Senran Kagura)
Azur Lane (2020), Peter Strasser
The Legend of Heroes: Kuro no Kiseki II – Crimson Sin (2022), Naje Berca
The Idolmaster series – Takane Shijō
Corpse Party series – Satsuki Mizuhara
Mugen Souls series – Dees Vanguard
Valkyrie Drive: Bhikkhuni series – Mana Inagawa
Nier Reincarnation - Mama

Discography

Singles
"Hanabi" (August 22, 2012)
"Hotarubi" (March 27, 2013)
"intention" (July 24, 2013)
"Rose on the breast" (June 25, 2014)
"Crossover" (October 29, 2014)
"improvisation" (May 27, 2015)
"Twilight ni Kienaide" (November 25, 2015)
"Prism Rain" (June 22, 2016)
"If you..." (January 25, 2017)

Albums
Place of my life (December 25, 2013)
Kokoro ni Saku Hana (September 25, 2015)
YOU&ME (March 14, 2018)

Music videos
Catch my voices (January 28, 2015)

References

External links
 Official profile
 Personal blog
 

1985 births
Voice actresses from Osaka Prefecture
Living people
Japanese video game actresses
Japanese voice actresses
Japanese women pop singers
Musicians from Osaka Prefecture
21st-century Japanese actresses
21st-century Japanese women singers
21st-century Japanese singers
Arts Vision voice actors